The Force India VJM08 is a Formula One racing car which Force India used to compete in the 2015 Formula One season. It was driven by Sergio Pérez and Le Mans winner Nico Hülkenberg.

History

The car's livery was first presented at an event in the Museo Soumaya in Mexico City on 21 January 2015, albeit using a modified chassis from a previous car instead of the VJM08 itself. The team did not participate at all in Jerez and elected to use their 2014 car at the first test in Barcelona. The VJM08 finally made its on-track debut at the second and final testing session in Barcelona. This delay was in part due to Force India switching to Toyota's Cologne-based wind tunnel in Germany. The new tunnel allows the team to test 60% scale models as opposed to the 50% scale they had been using with their old tunnel.

The team used a new car development model for the 2015 season. They aimed to increase the car's performance as the season went on through the introduction of a B-spec car and several other upgrades later in the season.

VJM08B 
For the 2015 British Grand Prix, Force India introduced a B-spec version of the car, featuring a distinct shorter nose with two holes in it. Initially, it was questioned whether the new nose complied with the FIA regulations, which did not allow vented noses. To stay within the regulations, the team introduced a spoon-shaped panel under the chassis, which also improved the car's airflow. Hülkenberg praised the changes, saying: "Now the car feels stronger, definitely." Over the course of the season, the team continued to introduce updates to the car including a new front wing, rear wing, rear suspension, floor, front and rear brake ducts and diffuser, among other things. At the Russian Grand Prix, Pérez scored a third-place finish. This was the team's third podium in its history. Ultimately, the team's upturn in form helped them achieve fifth place in the Constructor's Championship, their best season in its history at that point, despite scoring 19 fewer points than with its predecessor, the VJM07.

Complete Formula One results
(key) (results in bold indicate pole position; results in italics indicate fastest lap)

References

2015 Formula One season cars
Force India Formula One cars